Paul Marmy (1851–1897) was director of the Jardin des Plantes de Nantes around 1890.
The lilac Syringa vulgaris macrostachya carnea was named on Marny's advice.

References

1851 births
1897 deaths
French horticulturists